Johnny Edward Pacuraru (born June 6, 1981), known as Johnny Pacar, is an American film and television actor and musician of partial Romanian descent who is best known for his roles as Cody Jackson in the television series Flight 29 Down and as Damon Young on ABC Family's television series Make It or Break It. He also starred in the Disney Channel Original Movie Now You See It..., and had a recurring role as Jimmy Francis in American Dreams.

Biography
Johnny Pacar was born on  June 6, 1981. As a youth he always wanted to entertain people. He was an avid hockey player and always dreamed about one day playing in the NHL. However, he chose a different path when he started acting in drama and local theatre. In high school he formed a few bands driven by his punk rock influences, also getting into drama at school where he began doing high school and local theatre. After graduating at Wayne Memorial High School, he moved from Michigan to Los Angeles in May 2001. After two months there, he got an agent and filmed an international commercial for Sprite and landed a recurring role in Boston Public. Pacar also landed guest roles in Tru Calling, Judging Amy, George Lopez, CSI: Miami, Medium, Eli Stone, and starred in the Disney Channel movie Now You See It...
Pacar is best known for being cast as Jackson, a regular on the series Flight 29 Down for NBC/ Discovery Kids.

Pacar starred as Damon Young on ABC Family's Make It or Break It, a series about teenage gymnasts striving for the 2012 Olympics.

In 2011 he guest-starred in an episode of Warehouse 13 as Dwayne Maddox.
The same year he starred opposite Ving Rhames in syfy's Zombie Apocalypse.

In 2012 he landed a role in the action thriller Channeling  and in the same year his film Playback, opposite Christian Slater, was released.

He next starred in the Sony thriller The Remaining, which was released 2014.

Pacar won the "Best Supporting Actor" award at the Orlando Film Festival for his performance in Love Hurts.

Pacar is pursuing a music career. He released his own solo mini album "Moment of Time" on iTunes, and is in the band "Forever The Day" (formerly "Fairlene"), along with fellow Make it or Break it co-star Cody Longo.

"Forever The Day" released their first EP "Under The Afterglow" on August 16, 2010, and released a second part named "Letters of Letting Go" on February 13, 2012.

Pacar released a new solo album named Give It Our Love on March 11, 2013.

He currently lives in Los Angeles.

Filmography

Film

Television

References

External links 
 
 
 Forever The Day on Twitter

American male film actors
American male television actors
Living people
1981 births
People from Dearborn, Michigan
Male actors from Michigan
American people of Romanian descent
21st-century American male actors
21st-century American singers
21st-century American male singers